General Sir Thomas Lovett Morony  (23 September 1926 – 27 May 1989) was a British Army General who reached high office in the 1980s.

Military career
Morony was commissioned into the Royal Artillery in 1947. His first senior appointment was as Director of the Royal Artillery in 1975. He was then appointed, in 1978, Commandant of the Royal Military College of Science. In 1980 he was made Vice Chief of the General Staff and in 1983 he was appointed UK Military Representative to NATO.

He was also Colonel Commandant of the Royal Artillery from 1978 and of the Royal Horse Artillery from 1982.

He was ADC General to the Queen from 1984 to 1986.

References

|-

|-

|-

1926 births
1989 deaths
British Army generals
Knights Commander of the Order of the Bath
Officers of the Order of the British Empire
Royal Artillery officers
Military personnel from Portsmouth